Mitchell County Courthouse may refer to:

Mitchell County Courthouse (Georgia), part of the Camilla Commercial Historic District, Camilla, Georgia
 Mitchell County Courthouse (Iowa), Osage, Iowa
 Mitchell County Courthouse (Kansas), Beloit, Kansas
 Mitchell County Courthouse (North Carolina), Bakersville, North Carolina
 Mitchell County Courthouse (Texas), Colorado City, Texax